Events in the year 1968 in Mexico.

Incumbents

Federal government
 President: Gustavo Díaz Ordaz
 Interior Secretary (SEGOB): Luis Echeverría Álvarez
 Secretary of Foreign Affairs (SRE): Antonio Carrillo Flores
 Communications Secretary (SCT): José Antonio Padilla Segura
 Education Secretary (SEP): Agustín Yáñez
 Secretary of Defense (SEDENA): Matías Ramos
 Secretary of Navy: Antonio Vázquez del Mercado
 Secretary of Labor and Social Welfare: Salomón González Blanco
 Secretary of Welfare: Gilberto Valenzuela/Luis Enrique Bracamontes

Supreme Court

 President of the Supreme Court: Agapito Pozo Balbás

Governors

 Aguascalientes
Enrique Olivares Santana (until November 30)
Francisco Guel Jiménez (starting December 1)
 Baja California: Raúl Sánchez Díaz Martell
 Campeche: Carlos Sansores Pérez
 Chiapas: José Castillo Tielemans
 Chihuahua: Oscar Flores Sánchez
 Coahuila: Braulio Fernández Aguirre
 Colima: Pablo Silva García
 Durango: Alejandro Páez Urquidi
 Guanajuato: Manuel M. Moreno
 Guerrero: Raymundo Abarca Alarcón
 Hidalgo: Carlos Ramírez Guerrero 
 Jalisco: Francisco Medina Ascencio
 State of Mexico:  
 Michoacán: Agustín Arriaga/Carlos Gálvez Betancourt
 Morelos: Emilio Riva Palacio
 Nayarit: Julián Gazcón Mercado
 Nuevo León: Eduardo Elizondo
 Oaxaca: Rodolfo Brena Torres
 Puebla: Aarón Merino Fernández
 Querétaro: Juventino Castro Sánchez
 San Luis Potosí: Antonio Rocha Cordero
 Sinaloa: Leopoldo Sánchez Celis
 Sonora: Faustino Félix Serna
 Tabasco: Manuel R. Mora Martínez
 Tamaulipas: Praxedis Balboa	
 Tlaxcala: Anselmo Cervantes
 Veracruz: Fernando López Arias/Rafael Murillo Vidal
 Yucatán: Luis Torres Mesías
 Zacatecas: José Rodríguez Elías/Pedro Ruiz González 
Regent of the Federal District: Alfonso Corona del Rosal

Events
 October 2 – around 10,000 university and high school students gathered in the Plaza de las Tres Culturas to protest the government's actions and listen peacefully to speeches then the national guard attacked the demonstrations thus generating the Tlatelolco massacre.
 October 12 – October 27 – The Games of the XIX Olympiad are held in Mexico City.
 October 16 – In Mexico City, black American athletes Tommie Smith and John Carlos raise their arms in a black power salute after winning, respectively, the gold and bronze medals in the Olympic men's 200 metres.

Awards
Belisario Domínguez Medal of Honor – Miguel Angel Cevallos

Notable births
 February 9
Ana Colchero, actress and economist
Alejandra Guzman, singer and actress
 February 15 – Gloria Trevi, singer and actress
April 18 — Cuitláhuac García Jiménez, politician (Morena); Governor of Veracruz starting 2018
June 30 — Rafael Moreno Valle Rosas, Governor of Puebla 2011-2017 (d. 2018)
 July 15 – Leticia Calderon, actress
 July 27 – Jorge Salinas, actor
August 11 — Rolando Zapata Bello, politician (PRI); Governor of Yucatán 2012–2018
 September 22 – Eve Gil, writer
November 7 – Ignacio Padilla, writer, co-founder of Crack Movement (d. August 20, 2016).
November 11 — Miguel Márquez Márquez, Governor of Guanajuato 2012-2018
 November 28 – Ana Maria Alvarado, journalist
 December 12 – Tatiana, singer
 December 17 – Claudio Suarez, former soccer player (FIFA World Cup 1994, 1998, 2006)
Date unknown — Rubén Díaz Alcántara, Catholic priest, (d. 2018).

Notable deaths
 January 15 – Firpo Segura, Mexican boxer and wrestler.
 October 2 — Deaths related to the Tlatelolco massacre vary between 26 (official figure), and 325 (Octavio Paz)
 October 30 – Ramon Novarro, Mexican actor (born 1899).

References

External links

 
Years of the 20th century in Mexico
Mexico